Liubov Fomenko, known professionally as ETOLUBOV (born 12 August 1990, Odesa) is a Ukrainian singer.

Early life 

Lyubov Fomenko was born on August 12, 1990 in Odesa.

The future singer started to take an interest in music as a child. Her creative endeavors were supported by her parents and they bought her a piano. Liubov learned to pick up melodies by ear. Later she entered a music school, where she studied solfeggio for three years.

Musical career 

Lyubov Fomenko started her musical career under the stage name ETOLUBOV at the beginning of 2021. The debut single “Zagadala” along with a lyric video was released on January 28. In less than two months, the next single “Ty takoy” was released. The director of the video clip was the most famous clip-maker in Ukraine Alan Badoev. After a successful start, Liubov and Alan continued their cooperation. Badoev made almost all of ETOLUBOV's video works that followed.

On July 2, 2021, ETOLUBOV released the track “Piony” along with the music video featuring Volodymyr Rakov, the star of the TV show “Everybody's Dancing!”. Six weeks after the previous premiere, the singer presented the next single “Obmanu tebya”.

In September 2021, the single “Prityazhenie” was released. It appeared a milestone in the career of ETOLUBOV. The song was posted by top bloggers with more than 10 million followers, gained more than 100 thousands of TikTok and more than 100 thousands of Instagram Reels. It has been remixed for more than 500 times in genres ranging from lounge to trance, EDM and house music. “Prityazhenie” hit the Shazam charts in 16 countries and spent two months in Shazam World Top 100, peaking at #33. Also, the song topped the Shazam chart in Armenia, reached the second spot in Ukraine and Russia, became #3 in Tajikistan and #7 in Kazakhstan and Moldova. Mood video “Prityazhenie” was shot by the famous Ukrainian fashion photographer Ksenia Kargina in the desert near Kherson and at a chalk quarry near Mykolaiv.

After the success of the single “Prityazhenie”, ETOLUBOV signed a contract with one of the three biggest world majors, Warner Music Group. On November 12, 2021, the sixth single “Mango” was released. The official music video was a new joint work of ETOLUBOV and Alan Badoev. To shoot the video, the singer and the team went to the Seychelles. The song was released in two versions, one of them was made by the famous Ukrainian sound producer Yevhen Filatov (aka The Maneken). “Mango” became the singer's first single, that hit Ukraine’s radio Top-20. Also, the composition appeared in one of the biggest Spotify’s playlist the EQUAL.

At the end of October 2022, ETOLUBOV presented “Rymuyu”, a duet with Max Barskih. The song was dedicated to all Ukrainian couples who managed to preserve their feeling, — despite the separation caused by the war.

The music video “Rymuyu” was shot in Paris. Ksenia Kargina directed the clip while Alan Badoev acted as a creative producer, controlling the shooting remotely from Kyiv.

ETOLUBOV’s musical style could be described as neo-pop with elements of soul, electronica and oriental. Some of her fans note that her songs contains “a bit of mantric pop art house”.

On December, 9, 2022 her debut EP Pryrechena na Lubov was released. It included four tracks: kviten, rymuu, yaka and pryrechena.

Discography

EP 
2022 — Pryrechena Na Lubov

Singles 

2021 — Zagadala
2021 — Ty takoy
2021 — Piony
2021 — Obmanu tebya
2021 — Prityazhenie
2021 — Mango
2022 — Prityazhenie (Official Remix)
2022 — Rymuyu (ETOLUBOV & Max Barskih)

Videography

References 

1990 births
Living people
21st-century Ukrainian women singers
People from Odesa